Adelperga  is a monotypic snout moth genus in the subfamily Phycitinae. It was described by Carl Heinrich in 1956. It contains the species Adelperga cordubensiella, which was originally described as Heterographis cordubensiella by Émile Louis Ragonot in 1888. It is known from Argentina.

References

Moths described in 1888
Phycitinae
Moths of South America
Taxa named by Émile Louis Ragonot